Anthony Vincent Mumford (born June 14, 1963) is an American football former running back who played in the National Football League. He was selected in the 12th round (328th overall) of the 1985 NFL draft by the New England Patriots after playing college football for the Penn State. He played in two games during the 1985 season for the St. Louis Cardinals.

College career
Mumford was a member of the Penn State Nittany Lions for four seasons. He was a backup running back behind Curt Warner for his first two seasons, including the 1982 national championship team, and part of the running back rotation as a junior and senior. Mumford rushed for 1,103 yards and eight touchdowns during his collegiate career.

Professional career
Mumford was drafted in 12th round of the 1985 NFL Draft by the New England Patriots, but was cut by the team before the start of the season. He later signed with the St. Louis Cardinals, playing in two games towards the end of the 1985 season and returning one kickoff for 19 yards.

References

1963 births
Living people
American football running backs
Penn State Nittany Lions football players
St. Louis Cardinals (football) players
Players of American football from Philadelphia